Bhoothakaalam is a 2022 Indian Malayalam-language horror film written and directed by Rahul Sadasivan, starring Shane Nigam and Revathy. The film is produced by Anwar Rasheed under the banner Plan T Films in association with Shane Nigam Films. Gopi Sunder handles the background score while Shane Nigam makes his debut as a music director as well as producer. Principal photography took place from January 2021 to February 2021 in Kochi. The film had its worldwide premiere through SonyLIV on 21 January 2022 to widely critical acclaim. Revathi won her first Kerala State Film Award for Best Actress for her performance in the film during a career spanning 39 years.

Plot

Asha lives with her son Vinu taking care of her ill mother, who later dies. Asha is a school teacher and manages her home's finances single-handedly. Vinu has completed his B. Pharm and has been searching for a job for almost two years, but in vain. Unable to resist the struggle of unemployment, Vinu resumes his smoking and drinking habits. Asha is mentally and physically drained in trying to make Vinu find a job.

Vinu begins to get a feeling that there is someone else staying in his house. Initially, he assumes that it was his mother who was trying to show her anger at him, but is later convinced that there is actually somebody else. Just like his friends and relatives, Vinu's mother also thinks that something is wrong with him and takes him to a counselor. Vinu, however, does not cooperate with the counselor. While Asha begins to realise that Vinu's feelings about someone else being present in the house is true, the counselor learns about the past history of the house in which the mother and son are living. In the same house, several years ago, two people hung themselves unable to tolerate the feelings of the presence of another person. He also finds that both of them were suffering emotional setbacks due to different reasons back in their time.

Later, both Asha and Vinu get trapped in the house amidst horrific happenings. They are ultimately unsure as to the exact nature of what happened in the house, but decide to reconcile and vacate the house.

Cast
Revathi as Asha
Shane Nigam as Vinu
Saiju Kurup as George
James Eliya as Madhu
Athira Patel as Priya
Valsala Menon as Vinu's grandmother
Abhiram Radhakrishnan as Shyam
Gilu Joseph as Dr Beena
Manju Sunichen as Asha's neighbour

Music
Gopi Sundar did the background score for the film. The sole song from the film was written, composed and sung by Shane Nigam.

Track listing

Themes and analysis 

Bhoothakaalam deals with themes of psychological disorder and its effects. Though the film presents itself as horror, it is just as much an allegory for grief, trauma, clinical depression and how the central character is slowly going insane. The movie follows a template of connecting psychological disorder with fear inducing fantasy. The film also depicts the portrayal of characters who are affected by mental disorders like clinical depression and substance abuse, delivering a hard reality check on the gravity of such mental issues. The director has used an eerie looking house as a metaphor for the minds of its inhabitants, a mother and son. When the mother suffers from clinical depression, the son also shows similar traits of this suffocating state of mind. Asha is reluctant to take her anti-depressants, and Vinu is addicted to alcohol and drugs as an escape from crushing depression and sleeplessness. Once they both start to experience paranormal activities in the house they live in, their fear becomes real in their minds. The movie shows what psychosis is, a kind of overwhelming fear which is capable of twisting and tweaking reality. This can be a result of many underlying psychic problems like depression or substance abuse.

Its slow narrative builds this unsettling sense of atmosphere and dread of the unnatural and unknown, along with an unexpected but welcome mystery element. The concept of the paranormal is brought together playing with perspectives mixed with psychological settings. The subject also speaks about the universal fear of isolation and emotional longing. And when attaching this sadness and gloom to the central characters, the experience becomes haunting in a very personal and relatable way.

Reception 
B Rohan Naahar from The Indian Express stated: "Bhoothakaalam has one of the most thrillingly staged conclusions to any horror film in recent memory." The Hindu wrote: "Bhoothakaalam shows us how to get the scares right, in quite an understated, effortless fashion." calling it a "a textbook in how to scare the audience with minimal use of jump scare techniques." Sajin Srijith of The New Indian Express gave 4/5 stars and described Bhoothakaalam as a "Gimmick-free, supremely effective horror flick."

Writing for Hindustan Times, Devarsi Ghosh wrote that the film is a "moving mental health drama disguised as horror," praising the writing, acting and direction." Deepa Soman of The Times of India gave 3 out of 5 and wrote: "Though it's all staple horror film elements, thanks to the performance of the lead actors – one stays enticed till the last moment of the film to see how things turn out for the family in distress." Anna M. M. Vetticad of Firstpost gave the film 4 out of 5 stars praising the story, direction, performance, cinematography. She mentioned "mental health, the pressure of elder care, alcoholism, drug abuse, a flawed education system, unemployment."

Saibal Chatterjee of NDTV gave 3.5 out of 5 stars and wrote, the film is "fleshed out with commendable control by Revathi and Shane Nigam" as they "confront a rapid unravelling of their lives in a house where a dark secret lurks in the shadows." Sowmya Rajendran of The News Minute stated, the film became " one of the scariest horror films to come out in recent times."

Sanjith Sidhardhan from OTTplay gave 3.5 /5 stars and called  performances of lead cast "powerful," while appreciating "eerie atmosphere in which most of the story evolves." Manoj Kumar R from The Indian Express gave 3.5 out of 5 and wrote, "Shane Nigam is impressive as the man staring into the abyss while Revathi channels the pain of a torment soul. Together, they draw us by the collar and retain the hold till the very end." Cris from The News Minute gave 3.5 out of 5 and stated, "Bhoothakaalam is a well-prepared movie, scripted carefully and made richer by beautiful performances."

Filmmaker Ram Gopal Varma tweeted that he hasn't seen a more realistic horror film than Bhoothakaalam since William Friedkin’s The Exorcist (1973).

Film critic Anna M. M. Vetticad ranked it second in her year-end list of best Malayalam films.

Accolades

References

2022 horror films
2020s Malayalam-language films
Indian horror films